Week of development may refer to:
 Weekly unit of fertilization age
 One World Week (development charity)